KCY or kcy may refer to:

 KCY, the Amtrak station code for Kansas City Union Station, Missouri, United States
 KCY, the Indian Railways station code for Kaichar railway station, West Bengal, India
 kcy, the ISO 639-3 code for Korandje language, Algeria